Galano is a surname. Notable people with the surname include:

Cristian Galano (born 1991), Italian footballer 
Ivonne Malleza Galano, Cuban democracy activist
Luis Manuel Galano, Cuban Paralympic athlete

See also
Galanos